Grand Prix Pino Cerami is a single-day road bicycle race held annually in April in Hainaut, Belgium. Since 2005, the race is organized as a 1.1 event on the UCI Europe Tour.  Giuseppe 'Pino' Cerami, after whom the race is named, is a former Belgian road bicycle racer. He first raced in the professional peloton in 1946, and was naturalized a Belgian in 1956.

Winners

External links
 Official Website 

UCI Europe Tour races
Recurring sporting events established in 1964
1964 establishments in Belgium
Cycle races in Belgium
Sport in Hainaut (province)